Hamid Algar (born 1940) is a British-American Professor Emeritus of Persian studies at the Faculty of Near Eastern Studies, University of California, Berkeley. He writes on Persian and Arabic literature and contemporary history of Iran, Turkey, the Balkans and Afghanistan. He served on the UC Berkeley faculty for 45 years (from 1965 to 2010). Algar remains an active scholar and his research has concentrated on the Islamic history of the Perso-Turkish world, with particular emphasis on Iranian Shi'ism during the past two centuries and the Naqshbandi Sufi order. Algar is a Shia Muslim.

Algar, who was born in England, later converted to Sunni Islam and later chose to follow Shia Islam. He has also translated books written by contemporary political Shiite theologians, like Ruhollah Khomeini's book Velayat-e Faqih and books written by Ali Shariati, Murteza Mutahhari and Mahmoud Taleqani. For his enthusiastic promotion of Khomeinism as well as his heroic admiration for Ayatollah Khomeini, National Review dubbed him as "Khomeini’s Favorite American".

Furthermore, Algar is a denier of the Armenian genocide.

Life and career
After earning his B.A. with first-class honors in Oriental Languages (Arabic and Persian) at Trinity College, Cambridge, he was offered a scholarship to Tehran University in Iran, where he planned to work for his Ph.D. He then moved to Cambridge and defended his thesis in 1965. Algar wrote his Ph.D. on the political role of Shi'a religious scholars in the 19th century.

Algar met with Khomeini in exile in Paris and on brief occasions in Iran after the revolution there in 1979. He translated selected writings and speeches of Khomeini for Islam and Revolution, and also gave his own account, The Roots of the Islamic Revolution in Iran. He considers the Iranian revolution "the most significant, hopeful, and profound event in the entirety of contemporary Islamic history."

He received his formal training in Islamic studies at Cambridge University. In Berkeley he taught courses including tafsir, Sufism, Shi'ism, the history of Islam in Iran, Arabic, Persian and Turkish literature. Algar is the author of more than 100 articles in the Encyclopedia Iranica. In regards to his conversion to Islam, Algar has said, "I don't look like the average person's idea of a Muslim."

Views and scholarly critiques
Algar is described as "a seasoned scholar who knows his Islamic theology and modern Middle Eastern history". According to Algar, Wahhabis lie outside the wide orbit of Sunni Muslim orthodoxy. Algar criticizes the Saudi regime for supporting them as he believes the Wahhabism fed into movements such as the Taliban. He similarly charges United States for backing the Arabian Peninsula climate over the years. While his work on the political role of Shi'i clerics has been said to be "an outstanding study of one of the most interesting periods of Iranian history", some sources find Hamid Algar's explanations of complex events on the theoretical plane as simplistic.

Ervand Abrahamian refers to Algar's biography of Mirza Malkum Khan as "highly readable, well documented, and definitive" pointing out Algar's "meticulous scholarship". He does, however mention some of Algar's "minor" flaws in that work. Algar's translation of Arabic poetry has been described as a sensitive one which "often achieves a beauty and conviction equal to the original poem".

Controversies 
He caused a public incident in April 1998, during an on-campus commemoration of the Armenian genocide organized by the Armenian Students' Association, when he allegedly said that Armenian genocide never happened and made other controversial remarks. A subsequent complaint prompted the university to carry out an investigation. In January 1999, the five-month-long investigation concluded and found that while Professor Algar's comments "seem to fall within the bounds of constitutionally protected speech", it did not mean that "the University condones the type of speech used by the parties."

The Complaint Resolution Office did, however, issue an apology to the students on behalf of the university. Not satisfied with the university's response, the students turned to the Associated Students of UC Berkeley, which unanimously passed a resolution entitled "A Bill Against Hate Speech and in Support of Reprimand for Prof. Algar" on March 10, 1999.

Books
1- Imam Abu Hamid Ghazali,
2- Jesus in the Qur'an
3- Roots of The Islamic Revolution in Iran
4- Sufism: Principles and Practice
5- Surat Al-Fatiha: Foundation of the Qur'an
6- The Sunna: Its Obligatory and Exemplary Aspects
7- Wahhabism: A Critical Essay
8- Religion and State in Iran: 1785-1906 (Berkeley: University of California Press, 1969)
9- Mirza Malkum Khan: A Biographical Study in Iranian Modernism (Berkeley: University of California Press, 1973)
10- translator from the Persian with introduction and annotations to The Path of God's Bondsmen from Origin to Return by Najm al-Din Razi, known as Daya (Delmar, NY: Caravan Books, 1982)
11- translator and annotator, Islam and Revolution: Writings and Declarations of Imam Khomeini (Berkeley: Mizan Press, 1981)

External links 

 Hamid Algar - al-islam.org

References

1940 births
British emigrants to the United States
American Iranologists
Deniers of the Armenian genocide
Converts to Shia Islam from Sunni Islam
American Shia Muslims
University of Tehran alumni
Alumni of Trinity College, Cambridge
University of California, Berkeley College of Natural Resources faculty
Living people
Converts to Islam
Critics of Sunni Islam
Faculty of Letters and Humanities of the University of Tehran alumni
 
Armenian
Critics of Wahhabism